Budki may refer to the following places:
Budki, Łódź Voivodeship (central Poland)
Budki, Kraśnik County in Lublin Voivodeship (east Poland)
Budki, Lubartów County in Lublin Voivodeship (east Poland)
Budki, Łuków County in Lublin Voivodeship (east Poland)
Budki, Garwolin County in Masovian Voivodeship (east-central Poland)
Budki, Przasnysz County in Masovian Voivodeship (east-central Poland)
Budki, Szydłowiec County in Masovian Voivodeship (east-central Poland)
Budki, Pomeranian Voivodeship (north Poland)
Budki, Warmian-Masurian Voivodeship (north Poland)